Minuscule 893 (in the Gregory-Aland numbering), Νμ2 (von Soden), is a 12th-century Greek minuscule manuscript of the New Testament on paper, with a commentary. It was prepared for liturgical use.

Description 

The codex contains the text of the Gospel of Matthew, with a commentary, on 484 paper leaves (size ). The text is written in one column per page, 21 lines per page.
The manuscript was damaged by humidity.

Text 
The Greek text of the codex is a representative of the Byzantine. Kurt Aland placed it in Category V.

History 

According to C. R. Gregory it was written in the 12th century. Currently the manuscript is dated by the INTF to the 12th century.

It was once held in S. Michael in Muriano.

The manuscript was added to the list of New Testament manuscripts by Gregory (893e).

It is not cited in critical editions of the Greek New Testament (UBS4, NA28).

Currently the manuscript is housed at the Biblioteca Marciana (Gr. I,61 (1201)), in Venice.

See also 

 List of New Testament minuscules (1–1000)
 Biblical manuscript
 Textual criticism
 Minuscule 891

References

Further reading

External links 
 

Greek New Testament minuscules
12th-century biblical manuscripts